Veikko Iisakki Männikkö (28 December 1921 – 19 June 2012) was a Greco-Roman wrestler from Finland who won the national welterweight title (under 73 kg) in 1946 and 1950–1952, finishing second-third in 1948–49 and 1954. He competed at the 1948 and 1952 Summer Olympics and placed fourth in 1948. After retiring from competitions Männikkö worked at the Seinäjoki city government in 1955–1960. In parallel he acted as a sports official and functionary. He was married and had four children, born in 1946, 1954, 1955 and 1957.

References

1921 births
2012 deaths
Olympic wrestlers of Finland
Wrestlers at the 1948 Summer Olympics
Wrestlers at the 1952 Summer Olympics
Finnish male sport wrestlers
People from Jalasjärvi
Sportspeople from South Ostrobothnia